Erik Ľupták (7 June 1990 in Rimavská Sobota ) is a Slovak footballer who currently plays as a midfielder for TJ Baník Kalinovo in the 3. Liga.

Playing career 
Luptak began his career in 2008 in the Slovak Super Liga with MFK Dubnica. In 2009, he was loaned abroad to France to play with Evian Thonon Gaillard F.C. in the Championnat National. After his loan expired he returned to Dubnica where he received more playing time. In 2012, he had stints with TSG Neustrelitz and Putnok VSE. In 2014, he played with Astros Vasas in the Canadian Soccer League. He returned to Slovakia in 2014 to play in the 2. Liga with ŠK Senec, and MŠK Rimavská Sobota. In 2017, he was loaned to TJ Baník Kalinovo in the 3. Liga.

References

External links
MFK Dubnica profile 

1990 births
Living people
Slovak footballers
Thonon Evian Grand Genève F.C. players
FK Dubnica players
Association football midfielders
MŠK Púchov players
Slovak Super Liga players
Expatriate footballers in France
Expatriate footballers in Germany
TSG Neustrelitz players
North York Astros players
Canadian Soccer League (1998–present) players
Putnok VSE footballers
MŠK Rimavská Sobota players
2. Liga (Slovakia) players
Sportspeople from Rimavská Sobota